Şəhadət (also, Shadet and Shakhadat) is a village and municipality in the Goychay Rayon of Azerbaijan.  It has a population of 1,747. The municipality consists of the villages of Şəhadət and Qarabağlar.

References 

Populated places in Goychay District